Bakur II (Latinized as Bacurius), of the Chosroid Dynasty, was a king of Iberia (natively known as Kartli; ancient Georgia) from 534 to 547.

The name  is the Latin form of the Greek Bakour, itself a variant of the Middle Iranian Pakur, derived from Old Iranian bag-puhr ('son of a god'). The name "Bakur" is the Georgian (ბაკურ) and Armenian (Բակուր) attestation of Middle Iranian Pakur.

Bakur was the son and successor of King Dachi. According to the medieval Georgian chronicler Juansher, he died leaving young children and Iberia fell under Sassanid control. He had two children, Pharasmanes V and one of the parents of Pharasmanes VI.

See also
 Sasanian Iberia

References

Chosroid kings of Iberia
6th-century monarchs in Asia
Georgians from the Sasanian Empire